Steffen Bohl (born 28 December 1983) is a German retired footballer.

Career
Bohl started to play football with TuS Wachenheim, where he stayed until 1997. At the age of 14, he joined VfL Neustadt/Weinstraße and later SV Weingarten. As an important player in Weingarten he had the opportunity to go to the reserve squad of 1. FC Kaiserslautern in the third-tier Regionalliga, where he scored six times in 23 games during the 2005–06 season. He played in two of the final three games of the first squad in the Bundesliga, but had to see his club going down to the 2. Bundesliga.

There he became a frequent starter and scored six times during the 2006–07 season. He demonstrated his prowess during the game against TuS Koblenz, when he scored two times after a 0–2 and lead his squad to a 4–3 victory.

After the 2007–08 season, Bohl left Kaiserslautern and joined 3. Liga club VfR Aalen. On 2 June 2009, he signed a contract with SV Wehen Wiesbaden and transferred to Eintracht Braunschweig in January 2011. With Braunschweig, Bohl won promotion twice – from the 3. Liga to the 2. Bundesliga in 2011, and from the 2. Bundesliga to the Bundesliga in 2013. However, his contract in Braunschweig was not renewed after the 2012–13 season.

He joined MSV Duisburg for the 2014–15 season.

On 16 July 2016, he moved to SV Elversberg.

References

External links

Steffen Bohl at German Wikipedia

1983 births
Living people
People from Bad Dürkheim
German footballers
Footballers from Rhineland-Palatinate
1. FC Kaiserslautern players
1. FC Kaiserslautern II players
SV Wehen Wiesbaden players
VfR Aalen players
Eintracht Braunschweig players
Eintracht Braunschweig II players
FC Energie Cottbus players
MSV Duisburg players
SV Elversberg players
Bundesliga players
2. Bundesliga players
3. Liga players
Regionalliga players
Association football defenders
Association football midfielders